Parker v. Ellis, 362 U.S. 574 (1960), was a United States Supreme Court decision (per curiam) in which the court granted certiorari to review dismissal of petitioner's application for a habeas corpus review. The petitioner  claimed that his conviction in a state court had violated the Fourteenth Amendment's Due Process Clause. However, the petitioner was released from incarceration before his case could be heard.

Decision
The court held that the case was now moot; therefore the court had no jurisdiction to evaluate the merits of petitioner's claim. The writ of certiorari was dismissed for lack of jurisdiction.

See also
List of United States Supreme Court cases, volume 362
Jones v. Cunningham,

References

Further reading

External links
 

United States habeas corpus case law
United States Supreme Court cases
United States Supreme Court cases of the Warren Court
Overruled United States Supreme Court decisions
1960 in United States case law